Fusarium oxysporum f.sp. albedinis is a fungal plant pathogen that causes a disease known as Bayoud disease or fusarium wilt primarily on date palm.

Genome
Fernandez et al., 1998 identify the Fot1 (F.o. transposable elements) in F.o. albedinis.

Detection
F.o. albedinis may be diagnosed by molecular tests targeting sequences found by Fernandez et al., 1998.

See also
 List of date palm diseases

References

External links
 USDA ARS Fungal Database

oxysporum f.sp. albedinis
Fungal plant pathogens and diseases
Palm diseases
Food plant pathogens and diseases
Forma specialis taxa
Fungi described in 1930